Stojići may refer to 
Stojići, Bugojno, village in Bosnia and Herzegovina
Stojići, Kosjerić, village in Serbia

See also
Stojić, people with the surname